Espinillo is a Chilean village located in Pichilemu, Cardenal Caro Province. It was heavily damaged by the February 27, 2010 and March 11, 2010 earthquakes.

References

Populated places in Pichilemu